Dahak may refer to:

Places
 Dehak, Isfahan or Dahak, Isfahan
 Dehak, Tehran or Dahak, Tehran

People
 Driss Dahak (born 1939), Moroccan diplomat

Mythology
 Zahhak, an evil figure from Persian mythology
 Dahak, a demon in Zoroastrianism, see List of theological demons

Fictional characters
 Dahak, a character from the Xena/Hercules fictional universe
 Dahak, a character from David Weber's Dahak-series/Empire from the Ashes
 Dahak, the robot belonging to Red Savarin from Solatorobo: Red the Hunter

See also
 Dehak (disambiguation)